Royal purple, or Tyrian purple, is an ancient dye, or the color of that dye.

Royal Purple may also refer to:
 Royal Purple (lubricant manufacturer), an American manufacturer which produces lubricants for automotive, industrial, marine, motorcycle, and racing use.
 Royal purple (color), a shade of purple
 Royal Purple Yearbook, the official yearbook of Kansas State University
 Royal purple plant, Strobilanthes dyeriana

See also

 Royal Arch Purple